The 1991 CONCACAF U-17 Championship was a North American international association football tournament, it determined the 1991 FIFA U-17 World Championship entrants from the CONCACAF region. The 1991 edition of the competition was held in Trinidad and Tobago, the second consecutive tournament to be held on the twin island nation.

First round

Group 1

Group 2

Group 3

Final round

Cuba, Mexico and USA qualified to the 1991 FIFA U-17 World Championship in Italy.

CONCACAF Under-17 Championship
Under
International association football competitions hosted by Trinidad and Tobago
1991 in youth association football
1991 in Trinidad and Tobago football
1990–91 in Jamaican football